Rola is a Polish coat of arms. It was used by several szlachta families in the times of the Kingdom of Poland and Polish–Lithuanian Commonwealth.

One of the several Polish coats of arms which adopted Lithuanian catholic nobles due to Union of Horodło (1413) acts.

Blazon
Gules, a rose Argent seeded Or, encircled by three coulters Argent, one pointed downwards.

Notable bearers
Notable bearers of this coat of arms include:
 Jan Januszowski
 Piotr Wolyniec
 Balthasar "Balthus" Klossowski
 Pierre Klossowski
 Stanisław Kostka Gadomski
 Stanisław Lubieniecki
 Józef Niemojewski
 Stanisław Rola-Arciszewski
 Augustinus Rotundus
 Aleksander Rożniecki
 Jan Tarnowski
 Tomasz Wawrzecki

Gallery

See also
 Polish heraldry
 Heraldic family
 List of Polish nobility coats of arms 
 triskelion

External links 
  Rola Coat of Arms and bearers

Bibliography
 
 Jean Le Fevre de Saint-Remy (15th century). Armorial Toison d'Or. fol. 119v
 
 

Polish coats of arms